Płocicz  is a village in the administrative district of Gmina Kamień Krajeński, within Sępólno County, Kuyavian-Pomeranian Voivodeship, in north-central Poland.

The village has a population of 810.

References

Villages in Sępólno County